Mohammad Ali Foroughi (early August 1877 – 26 or 27 November 1942), also known as Zoka-ol-Molk (Persian: ذُکاءُالمُلک), was a writer, diplomat and politician who served three terms as Prime Minister of Iran. He wrote numerous books on ancient Iranian history and is known for founding the Academy of Iran.

Early life and education
Foroughi was born in Tehran to a merchant family from Isfahan. His ancestor, Mirza Abutorab was the representative of Isfahan in Mugan plain during Nader Shah Afshar's coronation. His grandfather, Mohammad Mehdi Arbab Isfahani, was amongst the most influential merchants of Isfahan and was skilled in history and geography. His father Mohammad Hosein Foroughi was the translator of the Shah from Arabic and French. He was also a poet and published a newspaper called Tarbiat. Naser al-Din Shah Qajar nicknamed Mohammad Hosein, Foroughi, after hearing a poem that he had written. During his early life, Foroughi studied at the élite Dar ul-Funun (Polytechnic school) in Tehran.

Career
In 1907, Foroughi's father died, and thus Foroughi inherited his father's title of Zoka-ol-Molk. During the same year, Foroughi became the dean of Tehran School of Political Science. In 1909, he entered politics as a member of Majlis (Parliament), representing Tehran. He subsequently became speaker of the house and later minister in several cabinets as well as prime minister three times and once as the acting prime minister when Reza Khan resigned as prime minister to take up the crown as Reza Shah. In 1912, he became the president of the Iranian Supreme Court. Later he was appointed prime minister and dismissed in 1935 due to the father of his son-in-law's, Muhammad Vali Asadi, alleged participation in the riot in Mashhad against the reforms implemented by Reza Shah.

However, later Foroughi regained his status and became Prime Minister during the initial phase of Mohammad Reza Pahlavi's reign. Foroughi as a prime minister was instrumental in having Mohammad Reza Pahlavi proclaimed as king after his father, Reza Shah, was forced to abdicate (16 September 1941) and exiled by the allied forces of the United Kingdom and the Soviet Union during World War II. After the collapse of his cabinet, he was named Minister of Court and then named ambassador of Iran to the United States of America, but he died in Tehran at the age of 67 before he could assume the post.

Contribution 
The most important contribution of Foroughi to philosophy is his triplet, "The Evolution of Philosophy in Europe", in which he covered the works of European Philosophers, starting from the Seven Sages of Greece in the 7th century BC through to Henri Bergson, in the 20th century.

Books 

Foroughi wrote numerous books, including

The History of Iran,
The History of the Ancient Peoples of The East,
A Short History of Ancient Rome,
Constitutional Etiquette,
A Concise Course in Physics,
Far-fetched Thoughts,
The Philosophy of Socrates,
The Evolution of Philosophy in Europe,
My Message to the Academy of Language (Farhangestan),
The Rules of Oratory or The Technique of Speech Making,
a book on the Shahnameh (The Book of Kings). 

In addition to this, he prepared scholarly editions of the works of Saadi, Hafez, Rumi, Omar Khayyam and Ferdowsi. The best-known of Foroughi's critical editions is Saadi's Kolliyat.

His son Mohsen Foroughi was a renowned architect who completed his studies in France and designed Niavarān Palace Complex, which is situated in the northern part of Tehran, Iran. It consists of several buildings and a museum. The Sahebqraniyeh Palace of the time of Nasir al-Din Shah of Qajar dynasty is also inside this complex. The main Niavaran Palace, completed in 1968, was the primary residence of the last Shah, Mohammad Reza Pahlavi and the Imperial family until the Iranian Revolution. Franz Malekebrahimian worked directly under Mohsen Foruoghi in implementation and maintenance of the Palace.

See also
 Pahlavi Dynasty
 List of prime ministers of Iran
 Abdolhossein Teymourtash
 Ali Akbar Davar
 Sayyed Hasan Taqizadeh

References

Sources
 'Alí Rizā Awsatí, Iran in the past three centuries (Irān dar Se Qarn-e Goz̲ashteh – ), Volumes 1 and 2 (Paktāb Publishing – , Tehran, Iran, 2003).  (Vol. 1),  (Vol. 2).

External links

 A short motion picture of Mohammad-Ali Foroughi'', from the film archives of Anoshirvan Sepahbodi, Geneva, 1931: YouTube.

1870s births
1942 deaths
Politicians from Tehran
Revival Party politicians
Prime Ministers of Iran
Government ministers of Iran
Iranian literary scholars
Members of the Academy of Persian Language and Literature
Speakers of the National Consultative Assembly
Members of the 2nd Iranian Majlis
Members of the 3rd Iranian Majlis
Ministers of Justice of Iran
20th-century Iranian politicians
Researchers of Persian literature
20th-century Iranian writers